Mohit Avasthi (born 18 November 1992) is an Indian cricketer. He made his List A debut on 1 March 2021, for Mumbai in the 2020–21 Vijay Hazare Trophy. He made his Twenty20 debut on 4 November 2021, for Mumbai in the 2021–22 Syed Mushtaq Ali Trophy. He made his first-class debut on 17 February 2022, for Mumabi in the 2021–22 Ranji Trophy.

References

External links
 

1992 births
Living people
Indian cricketers
Mumbai cricketers
Place of birth missing (living people)